Carl Potts (born November 12, 1952) is an American comics artist, writer, teacher, and editor best known for creating the series Alien Legion for the Marvel Comics imprint Epic Comics.

Early life
Born in Oakland, California, and raised in the San Francisco Bay Area and in Hawaii, Potts received an associate degree in commercial art from Chabot College in Hayward, California. He received his bachelor's degree in creative writing and editing from SUNY – Empire State College.

Career
After contributing to such comics fanzines as the anthology Venture, Potts drew backgrounds and some secondary figures for a late fill-in issue of DC Comics' Richard Dragon: Kung Fu Fighter, being drawn by Bay Area comics artists Jim Starlin and Alan Weiss. Potts began his comics career in 1975.

Relocating to New York City, he freelanced briefly until joining Neal Adams' commercial-art company and comic book packager Continuity Studios and was a member of the Crusty Bunkers. As he explained in a 2000 interview: "Continuity was gearing up to produce black-and-white magazines based on several TV series: The Six Million Dollar Man, Space: 1999, and Emergency!. I got involved with storyboard and comp art for major New York ad agencies. I also produced finished-illustration for magazines and books for several years before joining Marvel's editorial staff in 1983".

Marvel Comics
At Marvel as an editor, Potts discovered and/or mentored many top comics creators including Arthur Adams, Jon Bogdanove, June Brigman, Jim Lee, Mike Mignola, Mike Okamoto, Whilce Portacio, Terry Shoemaker, Steve Skroce, Larry Stroman, Sal Velutto, Chris Warner, and Scott Williams. He oversaw the development of the Punisher from guest star to franchise character, and edited such titles as The Incredible Hulk, Doctor Strange, The Defenders, The Thing, Alpha Flight, and Moon Knight, as well as the newly created Amazing High Adventure, Power Pack, Strikeforce: Morituri, and What The--?!. He was the editor who produced the first Rocket Raccoon miniseries. Potts' editorship was humorously characterized in 1988 as "a remarkable feat considering [his] legendary spelling disability."

After hours, Potts continued to write and produce occasional art for Marvel. He created the "Last of the Dragons" serial which appeared in Epic Illustrated #15–20 (Dec. 1982–Oct. 1983) and was written by Dennis O'Neil and inked by Terry Austin. In 1983, Potts teamed with Alan Zelenetz and Frank Cirocco to co-create the series Alien Legion, conceived as "the French Foreign Legion in space." Two ongoing series and several miniseries and one-shots were produced. In 2007, Potts' Alien Legion screenplay was optioned by producer Jerry Bruckheimer and The Walt Disney Company. Bruckheimer exercised the option and bought the script in 2010, hiring Game of Thrones show runner David Benioff to do a rewrite.

Potts wrote and, for the early issues, did layouts for the launch of the Punisher War Journal title in 1988 with Jim Lee doing the finished art. In 1989, Potts was named executive editor in charge of the Epic imprint, and about a third of the mainstream Marvel titles. Five years later, he became editor-in-chief of the "General Entertainment" and Epic Comics divisions.

Later career 
After 13 years at Marvel, Potts left to become Creative Director at VR-1, a massively multiplayer online game company. He then worked with Gary Winnick and Cirocco's Lightsource Studios before freelancing. He has taught at the School of Visual Arts and the Academy of Art University.

Personal life 
Potts and his wife Cathy have two children.

Bibliography

Books

Comics

Charlton Comics
 Space: 1999 magazine #7 (1976)

DC Comics
 Adventure Comics #453–455 (Aqualad backup stories) (1977–1978)
 Batman Family #11 (1977) 
 Richard Dragon: Kung Fu Fighter #2 (1975)
 The Superman Family #183 ("Nightwing and Flamebird" backup story) (1977)
 Time Warp #5 (1980)
 Who's Who: The Definitive Directory of the DC Universe #7, 9 (1985)
  Who's Who: Update '87 #4 (1987)

HM Communications, Inc.
 Heavy Metal #v2#10, #v4#2 (1979–1980)

Marvel Comics
 
 Doctor Strange vol. 2 #63 (1984)
 Heroes for Hope Starring the X-Men #1 (1985)
 Marvel Comics Presents #14, 124, 138–139, 160–163 (1989–1994)
 Marvel Fanfare #42 (1989)
 Marvel Holiday Special #2 (1993)
 Moon Knight #32–33, 35 (1983–1984)
 Official Handbook of the Marvel Universe #13 (1984)
 Official Handbook of the Marvel Universe Deluxe Edition #9, 14, 16, 20 (1986–1988)
 Power Man and Iron Fist #82–83, 86–89 (1982–1983)
 Prowler #1–4 (1994–1995)
 The Punisher Movie Special #1 (1990)
 The Punisher War Journal #1–15, 17–24 (1988–1990)
 Punisher: Origin Micro Chip #1–2 (1993)
 Shadowmasters #1–4 (1989–1990)
 Spellbound #1–4, 6 (1988)
 Spider-Man Family #8 (2008)
 Spider-Man Unlimited #4 (1994)
 Spider-Woman #47 (1982)
 Venom: Funeral Pyre #1–3 (1993)
 Venom: The Mace #1–3 (1994)
 Web of Spider-Man #107–108 (1993–1994)
 What If: Secret Invasion #1 (2010)
 Wolverine and the Punisher: Damaging Evidence #1–3 (1993)

Epic Comics
 Alien Legion #2 (1984) 
 Epic Illustrated #1, 13, 15–20 (1980–1983)
 Heavy Hitters Annual #1 (1993)

References

External links

General Eclectic (Carl Potts official blog). WebCitation archive.
Alien Legion official website.

1952 births
20th-century American artists
21st-century American artists
Academy of Art University faculty
American comics artists
American comics writers
American art educators
Artists from Oakland, California
Chabot College alumni
Comic book editors
Comics inkers
DC Comics people
Empire State College alumni
Living people
Marvel Comics people
Writers from Oakland, California